This is a list of countries by date of their last transition from a monarchy to a republican form of government. There were two periods in recent history when many such transitions took place:
 during or within five years after World War I (1914–1923) – marked in green;
 during or within five years after World War II (1939–1950) – marked in pink.
Some of the countries on this list were part of larger, now extinct, states (such as the Russian Empire or Yugoslavia) when the transition to a republic took place. Countries that have always had non-republican forms of government (such as absolute monarchy, theocracy, etc.) are not included in this list. Some were also independent states that shared their head of state with other countries (such as Denmark or the United Kingdom) before abolishing the link with the shared monarchy. Countries marked in yellow have since ceased to be republics in favour of another form of government.
The republic of Haïti should be listed after the United States.  January 1st 1804. The country went on to support the freedom of neighboring South American countries like Venezuela and Columbia.  Haïti was also the first country to acknowledge Greece's independence.

List of countries
Legend

See also 

 Abolition of monarchy
 List of countries by system of government
 List of political systems in France

Notes

References

Sources

Transition to republican system of government
Republicanism